Michael Argyle may refer to:
Michael Argyle (judge) (1915–1999), British judge
Michael Argyle (psychologist) (1925–2002), British social psychologist